Jorge Miguel Machado Almeida, known as Jorge Miguel (born 22 September 1990) is a Portuguese footballer who plays for Lusitânia as a defender.

Football career
On 16 September 2015, Jorge Miguel made his professional debut with Famalicão in a 2015–16 Segunda Liga match against Oliveirense.

On 16 July 2021, he signed with Lusitânia.

References

External links

Stats and profile at LPFP 

1990 births
People from Vila Nova de Famalicão
Living people
Portuguese footballers
Association football defenders
Liga Portugal 2 players
Campeonato de Portugal (league) players
F.C. Famalicão players
A.D. Lousada players
Académico de Viseu F.C. players
Lusitânia F.C. players
Sportspeople from Braga District